Maturase K (matK) is a plant plastidial gene. The protein it encodes is an organelle intron maturase, a protein that splices Group II introns. It is essential for in vivo splicing of Group II introns.  Amongst other maturases, this protein retains only a well conserved domain X and remnants of a reverse transcriptase domain.

Universal matK primers can be used for DNA barcoding of angiosperms.

See also 
 LtrA, an open reading frame found in the Lactococcus lactis group II introns LtrB. It is an intron-encoded protein, with three subdomains, one of which is a reverse-transcriptase/maturase.

References 

Plant genes